Ünal Üstel (born 1955) is a Turkish Cypriot politician currently serving as the Prime Minister of Northern Cyprus since 12 May 2022.

Biography 
He was re-elected in 2003, and later returned to the assembly in 2009, being re-elected again in 2013 before becoming the chamber's vice president for a second time between 4 September 2013 and 9 October 2015.

On 6 April 2011, Üstel became a member of İrsen Küçük's government as the Minister of Tourism, Culture, Youth and Environment. There he served for a period as the Minister of Public works before becoming the Minister of Health on 20 February 2021 following the dismissal of Ali Pilli. an office he held until 5 November 2021. he became the Minister of the Interior on 21 February 2022 following the formation of a new government.

Üstel took office as the Prime Minister of Northern Cyprus on 12 May 2022 after successfully forming a government.

Personal life 
Üstel is married and has two children.

References 

National Unity Party (Northern Cyprus) politicians
1955 births
Living people
People from Paphos
Istanbul University alumni
21st-century prime ministers of Northern Cyprus